Doubleback: Evolution of R&B is the eleventh studio album by American recording artist Joe. The album was released through Massenburg Media/RED Distribution on July 2, 2013 in the United States. It debuted at number six on the US Billboard 200 and number one on  the Billboard R&B Albums Chart selling 60,210 copies.

Background
Doubleback: Evolution of R&B will be the first release from Kedar Massenburg's newly formed company Massenburg Media after the dissolution of his former label Kedar Entertainment. Speaking of its title, he told YouKnowIGotSoul.com, that he felt "like today when you look at r&b music, it's almost like a shadow. We are sort of behind the scenes looking at everything else unfold. I want to inspire today’s generation to want to become r&b artists and to want to pick up an instrument. Either a piano, guitar, drums, whatever the case may be. To bring that classic old school sound to the fore front. If it was younger people doing it the way Marvin Gaye was doing it, Barry White was doing it, Stevie Wonder, Tina Turner [...] If you love singing and this style of r&b, just incorporate it into what you do, that's what makes things more beautiful." The singer worked with a small group of musicians on the album, including San Francisco-based producer D.O.A., who contributed “I'd Rather Have a Love” and the duet “Love & Sex”. Singer Fantasia appears on the latter, while rapper Fat Joe recorded vocals for the remix of “I'd Rather Have a Love”, which is included as a bonus track on the Best Buy track listing of the album. Rapper Too Short also appears on the album.

Promotion
The first single to be lifted from the album was “I’d Rather Have a Love”. Commenting on its release, Joe stated, that it "certainly represents my style and flavor [...] It has that really romantic element to it. It also speaks a lot of guys in a relationship that have a good thing going on but sometimes you know how we are. We forget what we have and we treat things a little differently. This is just a reminder basically, “I’d rather have love than nothing at all”. Who wants to be alone? It’s a great song."

Track listing

Charts

Weekly charts

Year-end charts

References

External links
[ Doubleback: Evolution of R&B] at Allmusic

2013 albums
Joe (singer) albums
Neo soul albums